Meteorites is the twelfth studio album by British band Echo & the Bunnymen. It was released on 3 June 2014 and produced by Youth and Andrea Wright. It was the band's first UK Top 40 album entry since 1999 (peaking at #37).

Title and artwork

Guitarist and lead vocalist Ian McCulloch said in reference to the album's title, "Meteorites' is what Echo and the Bunnymen mean and are meant to be—up there in heaven—untouchable, celestial, beautiful and real. It has changed my life." (The idea is mistaken—meteoroids are in space; meteorites have fallen to the ground.) The album's front cover, designed by Luke Insect, uses a thin-slice image of the Zagami meteorite from Mars. Pictures of other thin-sliced meteorites decorate the LP back cover and CD booklet.

Reception

The album mostly received average reviews.

Track listing

All tracks written by Ian McCulloch, except where noted.

"Meteorites" (Martin Glover, Ian McCulloch) (5:12)
"Holy Moses" (3:43)
"Constantinople" (4:55)
"Is This a Breakdown?" (3:56)
"Grapes Upon the Vine" (3:37)
"Lovers On the Run" (Glover, McCulloch) (4:46)
"Burn It Down" (3:57)
"Explosions" (Glover, McCulloch) (4:37)
"Market Town" (7:38)
"New Horizons" (5:26)

Personnel
Echo & the Bunnymen
Ian McCulloch—vocals, guitar, bass guitar, percussion, arrangements
Will Sergeant—guitar, arrangements, percussion

Additional personnel
Youth—bass guitar, production, mixing
Eddie Banda, Jamie Grashion, Tom Grashion—additional engineering
David Bianchi, Nick Ember—management
Michael Rendall—mastering, mixing, recording, programming
Andrea Wright—additional production, recording, programming
Luke Insect—design

References

Echo & the Bunnymen albums
2014 albums
429 Records albums
Albums produced by Youth (musician)